The 2007 Grote Prijs Jef Scherens was the 41st edition of the Grote Prijs Jef Scherens cycle race and was held on 2 September 2007. The race started and finished in Leuven. The race was won by Bram Tankink.

General classification

References

2007
2007 in road cycling
2007 in Belgian sport